The Mid-Ocean News was a Bermudian newspaper, published between 1911 and 16 October 2009. It was a sister publication of The Royal Gazette, which acquired it in 1962.

At the time, the Mid-Ocean News was a daily afternoon newspaper. In 1968, it became a weekly publication, distributed on Saturdays. From 1976 until the newspaper's final edition on 16 October 2009, it was a weekly newspaper published on Fridays.

In its final years, the newspaper had colour comics and a magazine-style television-programme section, and was published by The Bermuda Press (Holdings) Ltd., the owner of The Royal Gazette.

See also

 Lists of newspapers
 List of newspapers in Bermuda

References

External links
 Archival issues of The Mid-Ocean from the Digital Library of the Caribbean
 Bermudian National Library General Collection Information (PDF format)

20th-century establishments in Bermuda
English-language newspapers published in North America
Evening newspapers
Defunct daily newspapers
Defunct weekly newspapers
Hamilton, Bermuda
Newspapers published in Bermuda
Publications disestablished in 2009